Fredrik "Figge" Boström (born 11 November 1969, in Stockholm) is a Swedish musician, songwriter and music producer.

Eurovision Song Contest (national entries)

Discography
 1998 Meja - Seven Sisters - All´bout The Money, Too Many Nigh's Late, Caught Up In The Middle - bass
 1998 Meja - Radio Radio - Japan single - producer
 1999 Eiko Masumoto (Jpn) - From The First Touch - bass
 1999 Eva Dahlgren - La La Live - bass
 1999 Orup - Elva Hjärtan - producer
 2000 André De Lang - Educate Your Soul - Sunshine, Educate Your Soul, Could You Be (My Favourite Girl), Finally, For Your Love - co-writer
 2000 Emilia Rydberg - Girlfriend, If It's Gonna Be U - producer
 2000 Real Group - Commonly Unique - groove consultant
 2001 Eva Dahlgren - Too Many Beliefs - single - producer
 2001 Bosson - One In A Million - bass
 2002 No Angels (Ger)- Still in Love with You - co-writer
 2002 Afro-Dite - Celebration, MamaLou, Since Your Love Has Gone, Clap Your hands - co-writer - producer
 2003 Nikki Cleary (UK)- Fish Out Of Water - bass
 2003 Nektarios (Ger)- Look Like We Made It - bass
 2003 Fame Factory Volym 6 - Modupeh Sowe - Jump Around - producer
 2003 Magnus Bäcklund - Higher - producer
 2004 Fame Factory Volym 7 - Modupeh Sowe - Hand In Hand - Karl Martindahl - Call You - producer
 2004 Modupeh Sowe - Easy Come Easy Go, Movi´n - producer - co-writer
 2004 IDOL - Darin - Unbreak My Heart - Cornelia - What It Feels Like To Be A Girl - producer
 2004 Bosson - You Opened My Eyes - bass
 2005 Carola - Genom Allt - bass
 2005 Eric Bibb (US) - I'll Never Lose You - co-writer - co-producer
 2006 Micke Syd - Du och och Glenn Hysén - bass - co-producer
 2006 Eric Burdon (UK) - Feeling Blue - co-writer
 2006 Eric Bibb (US) - Shine On - co-writer - bass
 2006 Cotton Club - Christmas Cocktails - Papa Dee, Charlotte Perrelli, Jan Johansen, Pernilla Wahlgren, Sara Löfgren, Afro-Dite - musician - producer
 2007 Bosson - Simple Man Wishing - background vocals
 2007 André De Lang - Homecoming - bass - Record Label: Catfish Records
 2007 Magnus Carlsson - Kom Hem - discoremix
 2008 DBSK - Clap! - composer
 2008 Charlotte Perrelli - Hero, Bullet, Addicted - co-writer
 2008 Ola Svensson - Can't Get Enough, Feelgood, Love in Stereo - co-writer, bass
 2014 Girls' Generation-TTS (KOR) - Holler - co-writer, co-producer
 2017 Helene Fischer (GER) - Flieger, Sonne auf der Haut, Sowieso - co-writer
 2022 Girls' Generation (KOR) - Paper Plane - co-writer, co-producer

References

External links
Figge Boström - Catfarm Studios website
 Swedish Wikipedia
MySpace

1969 births
Living people
Swedish record producers
Swedish songwriters